Keon Darell Broxton (born May 7, 1990) is an American professional baseball outfielder for the Acereros de Monclova of the Mexican League. He has previously played in Major League Baseball (MLB) for the Pittsburgh Pirates, Milwaukee Brewers, New York Mets, Baltimore Orioles and Seattle Mariners.

Career
Broxton attended Lakeland Senior High School in Lakeland, Florida. The Philadelphia Phillies selected him in the 29th round of the 2008 MLB Draft. He did not sign and attended Santa Fe Community College in Gainesville, Florida to play college baseball. With Santa Fe, he appeared in the JUCO World Series.

Arizona Diamondbacks
The Arizona Diamondbacks selected Broxton in the third round of the 2009 MLB draft. Through 2012, he played for the Missoula Osprey of the Rookie-level Pioneer League, South Bend Silver Hawks of the Class A Midwest League, and Visalia Rawhide of the Class A-Advanced California League. The Diamondbacks assigned him to the Reno Aces of the Class AAA Pacific Coast League for the Triple-A National Championship Game, in which he hit a home run, helping the Aces win. He was added to the team's 40-man roster on November 19, 2012. Broxton played for the Mobile BayBears of the Class AA Southern League in 2013.

Pittsburgh Pirates
The Pittsburgh Pirates acquired Broxton from the Diamondbacks in March 2014 for a player to be named later. He played for the Altoona Curve of the Class AA Eastern League in 2014. He began the 2014 season with Altoona and was promoted to the Indianapolis Indians of the Class AAA International League during the season.

The Pirates promoted Broxton to the major leagues on September 20, 2015. Broxton was used mainly as a pinch runner, going 0-for-2 at the plate, as well as one stolen base and three runs scored.

Milwaukee Brewers

On December 17, 2015, the Pirates traded Broxton and Trey Supak to the Milwaukee Brewers for Jason Rogers. Broxton was one of nine players competing to be the Brewers center fielder for the 2016 season. He won the competition and started on Opening Day. He had his first career multi-home run game on August 21, 2016 against the Seattle Mariners. Broxton opened the 2017 season as the Brewers starting center fielder. On July 22, he was sent down to AAA. In 326 plate appearances, Broxton had been hitting .218 with 14 home runs and 17 stolen bases but was leading the majors in strikeouts with 124. Broxton was recalled from the minors on August 1, and went on to put together a 20-20 season (home runs and stolen bases) and finished with a slash line of .220/.299/.420.

Broxton remained in the Brewers' minor league system with the Colorado Springs Sky Sox of the PCL to open the 2018 season, as the Brewers made significant moves in free agency in the offseason and brought in All-Star centerfielder Lorenzo Cain. Cain suffered an injury on June 26, opening a roster spot for Broxton as Cain went on the disabled list. Broxton provided strong defense, including two home run robbing catches of Minnesota Twins players in one series, and had his third multi-home run game of his MLB career against the Cincinnati Reds.

New York Mets

On January 5, 2019, the Brewers traded Broxton to the New York Mets for Bobby Wahl, Adam Hill, and Felix Valerio. He struggled during his brief stint with the team, hitting just .143 with 2 runs batted in. He was designated for assignment on May 17, 2019.

Baltimore Orioles
He was traded by the Mets to the Baltimore Orioles for international signing bonus slots on May 22, 2019. He hit a two-run homer to left on the first pitch of his first Orioles plate appearance off Jeff Hoffman in an 8–6 loss to the Colorado Rockies at Coors Field two days later on May 24. Broxton's time with the Orioles lasted only two months as he was designated for assignment on July 21 due to striking out in 49 of 112 plate appearances (43.75%) and the emergence of Anthony Santander.

Seattle Mariners
He was claimed off waivers by the Seattle Mariners on July 27, 2019. On August 27, he was suspended two games and fined an undisclosed amount for throwing his batting glove at an umpire for arguing balls-and-strikes in the previous game.

Milwaukee Brewers (second stint)
On December 8, 2019, Broxton signed a minor league contract with the Milwaukee Brewers. He became a free agent on November 2, 2020.

Minnesota Twins
On February 8, 2021, Broxton signed a minor league contract with the Minnesota Twins organization that included an invitation to Spring Training. In 73 games with the Triple-A St. Paul Saints, Broxton struggled, hitting .186 with 9 home runs and 26 RBI's. On  August 19, the Twins released Broxton.

Milwaukee Brewers (third stint)
On August 31, 2021, Broxton signed a minor league deal to return to the Milwaukee Brewers. He was assigned to the Rookie Arizona Complex League Brewers Gold.

Acereros de Monclova
On January 17, 2022, Broxton signed with the Acereros de Monclova of the Mexican League for the 2022 season.

Personal life
On November 4, 2016 in Tampa, Broxton was arrested for misdemeanor trespassing. Broxton, who was reportedly intoxicated, refused to leave the scene of a fight despite the warnings from responding police officers.

References

External links

1990 births
Living people
African-American baseball players
American expatriate baseball players in Australia
American expatriate baseball players in Mexico
Sportspeople from Lakeland, Florida
Baseball players from Florida
Major League Baseball outfielders
Pittsburgh Pirates players
Milwaukee Brewers players
New York Mets players
Baltimore Orioles players
Seattle Mariners players
Missoula Osprey players
South Bend Silver Hawks players
Visalia Rawhide players
Mobile BayBears players
Sydney Blue Sox players
Altoona Curve players
Indianapolis Indians players
Colorado Springs Sky Sox players
St. Paul Saints players
Arizona League Brewers players
Nashville Sounds players
Acereros de Monclova players
21st-century African-American sportspeople
Junior college baseball players in the United States